Maxwell Reinhart (born February 4, 1992) is a Canadian former professional ice hockey player. He played in the NHL for the Calgary Flames.

Reinhart played four seasons of junior hockey with the Kootenay Ice and was a member of their 2011 Western Hockey League championship team before turning professional in 2012.  Along with Griffin and Sam, he is one of three hockey-playing brothers, the sons of former NHL player Paul Reinhart.

Playing career

Junior
Reinhart played minor hockey in West Vancouver, British Columbia, where his father Paul, a former National Hockey League (NHL) player, settled following his career. Max viewed his father as the greatest influence on his development as a player, and found that being the son of a former NHL player made it easier for him to be noticed by scouts. He was drafted into the Western Hockey League (WHL) by the Kootenay Ice with their fourth round selection, 86th overall, at the 2007 WHL Bantam Draft.

As a junior, Reinhart played four seasons at centre with the Ice between 2008 and 2012 where he scored 235 points in 266 games. Following a 27-point campaign as a 16-year-old in 2008–09, he improved to 51 points in 2009–10 and earned a spot with the Canadian under-18 team at the 2010 IIHF World U18 Championships. Reinhart appeared in six games in the tournament, scoring one assist for the seventh-placed Canadians.  Reinhart was selected in the third round (63rd overall) at the 2010 NHL Entry Draft by the Calgary Flames, the same franchise that drafted his father 12th overall in 1979.

Returning to the Ice for the 2010–11 WHL season, Reinhart finished second in team scoring, behind Cody Eakin, with 79 points in 71 games. In the 2011 playoffs, he tied a league record becoming the fourth player in league history to score five goals in one game in a 7–2 victory over the Medicine Hat Tigers. Reinhart scored 27 points in 19 playoff games, tying five players for second overall in post-season scoring, as the Ice won the Ed Chynoweth Cup after defeating the Portland Winterhawks in the WHL championship series. Playing his final season of junior in 2011–12, Reinhart led the Ice with 78 points, and was named to the WHL Second All-Star Team.

Professional
The Flames signed Reinhart to a three-year entry level contract on July 14, 2011, prior to his final season with the Ice. He made his professional debut after the Ice's season ended. Reinhart joined Calgary's American Hockey League (AHL) affiliate, the Abbotsford Heat, to conclude the 2011–12 AHL season, where he scored two goals in his professional debut. He added a goal and an assist in four playoff games.  In his first full season with the Heat in 2012–13, Reinhart struggled to play at a consistent level; the 21-year-old said he hadn't had many years in hockey where he struggled offensively. He had only four points in his first 33 games with Abbotsford, but improved throughout the season, scoring 17 points in his following 34 games.

The Calgary Flames recalled Reinhart on April 6, 2013, a decision that surprised him despite his improved play. He made his NHL debut that night in his hometown, a 5–2 loss to the Vancouver Canucks. Reinhart made his debut with the Flames franchise that his father began his own career with and played nine seasons for, and against a Canucks team that Paul spent his final two seasons with.  Reinhart earned his first NHL point four nights later, also against the Canucks, assisting on a Curtis Glencross goal, and scored his first goal against Edmonton Oilers' goaltender Nikolai Khabibulin on April 13 in a 4–1 victory. He finished the season with a goal and two assists in 11 games with the Flames, and 21 points in 67 games with Abbotsford.

Reinhart spent the majority of the 2013–14 season with the Heat, though he appeared in eight games with the Flames and recorded two assists. He led the Heat with 63 points in 66 games, and in doing so, broke Krys Kolanos' Abbotsford team scoring record (61).

On July 1, 2015, Reinhart was traded by the Flames to the Nashville Predators in exchange for a conditional fourth-round selection in 2016. He did not see any NHL action during the 2015–16 season, but made 73 appearances for Nashville's AHL affiliate, the Milwaukee Admirals, tallying 23 goals and 15 assists. He also played three postseason contests.

In the following off-season, Reinhart took up an offer from Germany, signing with Kölner Haie of the Deutsche Eishockey Liga (DEL) on June 6, 2016. In the 2016–17 season, Reinhart provided versatility throughout the lineup, providing 6 goals and 23 points in 52 games.

On July 1, 2017, Reinhart returned to the NHL in signing as a free agent to a one-year, two-way contract with the Ottawa Senators.

Personal life
Max is the eldest of three sons to Paul and Theresa Reinhart.  His younger brothers also play hockey: Griffin was a first round draft pick of the New York Islanders in 2012, and youngest brother Sam plays for the Florida Panthers having been drafted by the Buffalo Sabres in the 2014 NHL Entry Draft. The three brothers played with and against each other throughout their junior careers, as Sam was a teammate of Max's on Kootenay's championship team while the pair opposed Griffin, who was a member of the Edmonton Oil Kings. Reinhart is the only one of the brothers who was not drafted in the first round of the NHL Entry Draft.

Career statistics

Regular season and playoffs

International

Awards and honours

See also
List of family relations in the NHL

References
Career statistics:

External links

1992 births
Abbotsford Heat players
Adirondack Flames players
Belleville Senators players
Calgary Flames draft picks
Calgary Flames players
Canadian ice hockey centres
Kölner Haie players
Kootenay Ice players
Living people
Milwaukee Admirals players
Ice hockey people from Vancouver
Canadian expatriate ice hockey players in Germany